General elections were held in Nepal on 12 May 1991, to elect 205 members to the House of Representatives. The elections were the first multi-party elections since 1959. The 1990 Nepalese revolution successfully made King Birendra to restore a multi-party system after King Mahendra had established the Rastriya Panchayat when he dissolved the parliament in December 1960.

Results

Aftermath 
Following the result of the election, Nepali Congress came to power and Girija Prasad Koirala became Prime Minister. The house met for the first time in May 1991. Daman Nath Dhungana served as the Speaker of the House. The parliament could not complete its full five-year term with Girija Prasad Koirala asking King Birendra to dissolve the house in July 1994 after losing a no-confidence motion with some member of his own party voting against him.

See also
List of MPs elected in the 1991 Nepalese general election

References

General elections in Nepal
Nepal
1991 elections in Nepal
May 1991 events in Asia